Asiaephorus sythoffi is a moth of the family Pterophoridae. It is known from Java and Taiwan.

The wingspan is 16–18 mm.

External links
Taxonomic And Biological Studies Of Pterophoridae Of Japan (Lepidoptera)
Asiaephorus gen. nov., a review and description of a new species (Lepidoptera: Pterophoridae)

Platyptiliini
Moths described in 1903